Séraphin: Heart of Stone (Lit. "Séraphin: A man and his sin") is a Quebec film released in 2002. The script is based on the novel Un homme et son péché by Claude-Henri Grignon. The film won six Prix Jutra for Best Actor (Pierre Lebeau), Best Actress (Karine Vanasse), Cinematography, Art Direction, Musical Score and Sound. An earlier film, A Man and His Sin (Un homme et son péché), based on the same novel, was released in 1949; the same novel was also the basis for the long-running dramatic television series Les Belles histoires des pays d'en haut.

Plot
In a small Quebec community at the end of the 19th century, due to her father's financial hardships, Donalda Laloge (Vanasse) is forced to marry the village miser (also the mayor), Séraphin Poudrier (Lebeau), and to leave behind the young man that she truly loves. Her beloved, Alexis (Roy Dupuis), returns from working at the lumber camps, unaware of these events.

Donalda is extremely unhappy living with Séraphin, as his miserly lifestyle is often at the expense of her personal well-being. This includes refusing to father children, and severely rationing meals. Donalda becomes very sick with a pneumonia-like illness. Alexis returns home meanwhile, and his realizing of the situation sparks tension among the villagers.  Donalda dies from the disease shortly after his arrival. During Donalda's funeral, Séraphin realizes his home is on fire. He panics and runs into the blaze, succumbing to the flames as he attempts to save his wealth. Alexis pulls him out of the burning house. The villagers pry open Séraphin's hands, which are revealed to have been clutching coins.

External links

 Un homme et son péché Official web site (Alliance Atlantis Vivafilm)
 Régie du Cinéma Québec: Séraphin: un homme et son péché

2002 films
2000s French-language films
Canadian drama films
Canadian Screen Award-winning films
Films set in Quebec
2002 drama films
Films directed by Charles Binamé
French-language Canadian films
2000s Canadian films